Pazar District is a district of the Rize Province of Turkey. Its seat is the town of Pazar. Its area is 173 km2, and its population is 31,678 (2021).

Composition
There is one municipality in Pazar District:
 Pazar

There are 48 villages in Pazar District:

 Akbucak
 Akmescit
 Aktaş
 Aktepe
 Alçılı
 Balıkçı
 Başköy
 Boğazlı
 Bucak
 Dağdibi
 Darılı
 Derebaşı
 Derinsu
 Dernek
 Elmalık
 Güneyköy
 Hamidiye
 Handağı
 Hasköy
 Hisarlı
 Irmakköy
 Irmakyeniköy
 Kayağantaş
 Kesikköprü
 Kuzayca
 Merdivenli
 Örnek
 Ortaırmak
 Ortayol
 Papatya
 Sahilköy
 Şehitlik
 Şendere
 Şentepe
 Sessizdere
 Sivrikale
 Sivritepe
 Subaşı
 Suçatı
 Sulak
 Tektaş
 Topluca
 Tütüncüler
 Uğrak
 Yavuzköy
 Yemişli
 Yeşilköy
 Yücehisar

References

Districts of Rize Province